Francesco Samà (2 July 1940 – 10 February 2022) was an Italian politician.

A member of the Italian Communist Party, he served in the Chamber of Deputies from 1983 to 1992. He died in Crotone on 10 February 2022, at the age of 81.

References

1940 births
2022 deaths
20th-century Italian politicians
Italian Communist Party politicians
Democratic Party of the Left politicians
Deputies of Legislature IX of Italy
Deputies of Legislature X of Italy
Mayors of places in Calabria
People from the Province of Crotone